First Families of Virginia (FFV) were those families in Colonial Virginia who were socially prominent and wealthy, but not necessarily the earliest settlers. They descended from English colonists who primarily settled at Jamestown, Williamsburg, the Northern Neck and along the James River and other navigable waters in Virginia during the 17th century. These elite families generally married within their social class for many generations and, as a result, most surnames of First Families date to the colonial period.

The American Revolution cut ties with Britain but not with its social traditions. While some First Family members were loyal to Britain, others were Whigs who not only supported, but led the Revolution. Most First Families remained in Virginia, where they flourished as tobacco planters, and from the sale of enslaved people to the cotton states to the south. Indeed, many younger sons were relocated into the cotton belt to start their own plantations. With the emancipation of enslaved people during the Civil War and the consequential loss of slave labor, Virginia plantations struggled to turn a profit. The First Families, albeit poorer than before, maintained social and political leadership. Marshall Fishwick says that by the 1950s, "the old-time aristocracy [had] not given up, or sunk into decadence as Southern novelists suggest." They adopted modern agricultural technology and co-opted rich "Yankees" into their upper-class, rural horse-estate society.

English heritage, second sons

English colonists who formed the FFV emigrated to the new Colony of Virginia. Their migration took place from the settlement of Jamestown through the English Civil War and English Interregnum period (1642–1660). Some royalists left England on the accession to power of Oliver Cromwell and his Parliament. Because most of Virginia's leading families recognized Charles II as King following the execution of Charles I in 1649, Charles II reputedly called Virginia his "Old Dominion" – a nickname that endures today. The affinity of many early Virginia settlers for the Crown led to the term "distressed Cavaliers", often applied to the Virginia plantocracy. Some Cavaliers who served under King Charles I fled to Virginia. FFVs often refer to Virginia as "Cavalier Country". These men were offered land or other rewards by King Charles II, but most who had settled in Virginia stayed in Virginia.

Many such early settlers in Virginia were called Second Sons. Primogeniture favored the first sons' inheriting lands and titles in England. Second or third sons went out to the colonies to make their fortune, or entered the military and the clergy. Tidewater Virginia evolved as a society descended from second or third sons of Englishmen who inherited land grants or land in Virginia. They formed part of what became the Southern elite in Colonial America.

In some cases, longstanding ties among families in England were carried to the new colony, where they were reinforced by marriage and other relations. For instance, there were ancestral ties between the Spencer family of Bedfordshire and the Washington family; a Spencer secured the land grant later purchased by the Washingtons, where they built their Mount Vernon home. These sorts of ties were common in the early colony, as families shuttled back and forth between England and Virginia, maintaining their connections with the mother country and with each other.

A thin network of increasingly interrelated families made up the planter elite and held power in colonial Virginia. "As early as 1660, every seat on the ruling Council of Virginia was held by members of five interrelated families," writes British historian John Keegan, "and as late as 1775, every council member was descended from one of the 1660 councillors."

The ties among Virginia families were based on marriage. In a pre-Revolutionary War economy dependent on the production of tobacco as a commodity crop, the ownership of the best land was tightly controlled. It often passed between families of corresponding social rank. The Virginia economy was based on slave labor as the colony became a slave society. The landed gentry could keep tight rein on political power, which passed in somewhat orderly fashion from family to family. (In the more modern mercantile economy of the north, social mobility became more prominent. The power of the elite was muted by newcomers who gained wealth in the market economy.)

Pocahontas 

Pocahontas (1595–1617), a Native American, was the daughter of Chief Powhatan, founder of the Powhatan Confederacy. According to Mattaponi and Patawomeck tradition, Pocahontas was previously married to a Patawomeck weroance, Kocoum, who was murdered by Englishmen when Samuel Argall abducted her on April 13, 1613. Educated among the English of Virginia and converted to Christianity during her captivity in Henricus, Pocahontas married colonist John Rolfe at a church in Jamestown on April 5, 1614. Rolfe had become prominent and wealthy as the first to successfully develop an export cash crop for the colony with new varieties of tobacco. Their only child, Thomas Rolfe, was born on January 30, 1615. He married and had a family: his descendants married into other elite families.

Pocahontas was much celebrated in London, where she was welcomed with great ceremony at the Royal Court. She died young but became legendary as the first Indian from Virginia to become Christian, marry an Englishman, and have a known child from such a marriage. (There were no doubt mixed-race children born to lower-class colonists and Algonquian women, although they may have been neither married nor Christian.) She became an important symbol of friendly Native American-English relations of the Jamestown colony. By virtue of many fictional accounts, her marriage was romanticized and became part of the mythology of early American history.

Organizing the FFV
In 1887, following the Reconstruction era after the Civil War, Virginia Governor Wyndham Robertson wrote the first history of Pocahontas and her descendants, delineating the ancestry of FFV families including the Bollings, Clements, Whittles, Blands, Skipwiths, Flemings, Catletts, Gays, Jordans, Randolphs, Tazewells, and many others. Excluded from this history were 'natural children', mixed-race descendants of unions with slaves.

Families often used surnames as given names, as in the "Johns" of Johns Hopkins University. A mother's maiden name might be used as a "middle name", to document that part of the person's ancestry. For example, Lt. Col. Powhatan Bolling Whittle of the 38th Virginia Infantry, Confederate States Army was an uncle of Matoaka Whittle Sims.

In 1907, the Jamestown Exposition was held near Norfolk to celebrate the tricentennial of the arrival of the first English colonists and the founding of Jamestown. Preservation Virginia, formerly known as the Association for the Preservation of Virginia Antiquities, was founded in Williamsburg in 1889 to memorialize Virginia history. In the 20th century, Preservation Virginia emphasized patriotism by highlighting the Founding Fathers that hailed from Virginia.

Notable families

Some notable family names include: 

Allerton
Archer
Bacon
Baskerville
Belcher
Bentley
Berkeley
Beverley
Billingsley
Blair
Bland
Bolling
Branch
Braxton
Browne
Buckner 
Burwell
Byrd
Capps
Carter
Cary
Chiles
Christian
Conway
Dameron/Damron
Dandridge
Dalton
Dudley
Duke
Elam
Eldridge
Fairfax
Farrar
Fielding
Fitzhugh
Gooch
Graves
Hardy
Harris
Harrison
Hopkins
Jefferson
Jenings
Kennon
Lee
Madison
Marshall
Mathews
Maupin
Morgan
Nash
Nelson
Norvell
Omohundro 
Page
Payne
Randolph
Robinson
Rolfe
Saunders
Selden
Sharp
Shifflett family 
Skillern
Spencer
Stagner 
Starnes
Stith
Taliaferro
Tayloe
Taylor
Waller
Warner
 Warren
Washington
West

See also
 Colonial families of Maryland
 American gentry

References

Further reading
 
 
 
 Willison, George F. Behold Virginia: the fifth crown. Being the trials, adventures & disasters of the first families of Virginia, the rise of the grandees & the eventual triumph of the common & uncommon sort in the Revolution (1951), popular history by a scholar

Notes on sources
Note: Source 1: Captain William Tucker / Author: Barbara Jennifer Benefield / Publication: RootsWeb.com, May 12, 2004
Note: Source 2 / Author: Doug Tucker / Publication: GenForum, Jan 16, 2006
Note: Source 3 / Author: Marie Moore / Publication: RootsWeb.com, Nov 29, 2004 / "Note: died at sea"
Note: Source 4 / Author: Phillip Judson Clark / Title: Royal Families and Others & also their Famous Descendants / Publication: rootsweb.com, Jan 1, 2008

External links
"Becoming Virginians, The Story of America: A Virginian Experience", Virginia Historical Society, vahistoricalsociety.org

 
History of Virginia
Lineage societies